The 2017 Robert Morris Colonials football team represented Robert Morris University during the 2017 NCAA Division I FCS football season. They were led by fourth-year head coach John Banaszak and played their home games at Joe Walton Stadium. They were a member of the Northeast Conference. They finished the season 2–9, 0–6 in NEC play to finish in last place.

On November 19, head coach John Banaszak announced his retirement. He finished at Robert Morris with a four-year record of 8–34.

Schedule

Game summaries

Dayton

at Youngstown State

VMI

at North Dakota State

at East Tennessee State

Duquesne

Sacred Heart

at Saint Francis (PA)

at Wagner

Bryant

at Central Connecticut

References

Robert Morris
Robert Morris Colonials football seasons
Robert Morris Colonials football